Kosmos 2340 ( meaning Cosmos 2340) was a Russian US-K missile early warning satellite which was launched in 1997 as part of the Russian Space Forces' Oko programme. The satellite was designed to identify missile launches using optical telescopes and infrared sensors.

Kosmos 2340 was launched from Site 16/2 at Plesetsk Cosmodrome in Russia. A Molniya-M carrier rocket with a 2BL upper stage was used to perform the launch, which took place at 08:59 UTC on 9 April 1997. The launch successfully placed the satellite into a molniya orbit. It subsequently received its Kosmos designation, and the international designator 1997-015A. The United States Space Command assigned it the Satellite Catalog Number 24761. The satellite (along with Kosmos 2351, Kosmos 2368, and Kosmos 2342) were lost after a 2001 fire destroyed the ground control building located at the Serpukhov-15 military base resulting in the loss of orbital control.

See also

List of Kosmos satellites (2251–2500)
List of R-7 launches (1995–1999)
1997 in spaceflight
List of Oko satellites

References

Kosmos satellites
Spacecraft launched in 1997
Oko
Spacecraft launched by Molniya-M rockets